Saad Abdellah Bguir (born 22 March 1994) is a Tunisian professional footballer who plays for Abha.

Club career 
In the 2014–15 season, Stade Gabésien went all the way to the Tunisian Cup Finals, losing to the Etoile Sportive du Sahel. During the final, Saad scored a free kick and gave two assists. He was awarded MVP of the match.

International career

International goals
Scores and results list Tunisia's goal tally first.

Honours

Club
Stade Gabèsien
 Tunisian Cup: (Runner-up) 2014–15

Individual
 Saudi Professional League Player of the Month: November & December 2019

References

External links 
 Official Website
 

1994 births
Living people
Tunisian footballers
Tunisian expatriate footballers
Tunisia international footballers
Association football midfielders
2015 Africa U-23 Cup of Nations players
Tunisia under-23 international footballers
US Tataouine players
Stade Gabèsien players
Espérance Sportive de Tunis players
Abha Club players
Tunisian Ligue Professionnelle 1 players
Saudi Professional League players
Expatriate footballers in Saudi Arabia
Tunisian expatriate sportspeople in Saudi Arabia
Tunisia A' international footballers
2016 African Nations Championship players